Up Late or UpLate may refer to:

Television
 UpLate, a weeknightly Big Brother Australia show
 UpLate, a weeknightly Pinoy Big Brother show
 The Up-Late Game Show, a late night show that replaced Big Brother Australia'''s UpLateMusic
 "Up Late", a song by Custom Kings from Now Summer 2008 (Australian series)
 "Up Late", a song by Kodak Black from Project Baby 2 (2017)
 "Up Late", a song by Ari Lennox from Shea Butter Baby'' (2019)